Dubaj may refer to:
 Dubaj, Lasht-e Nesha
 Dubaj (37°23′ N 49°49′ E), Lasht-e Nesha